Sonic Violence are a British band, formed in Southend, Essex, England, in the late 1980s by Andy Whiting and “Auntie”, who had previously played in punk band The Sinyx. The band were among the first acts to be signed to Peaceville Records, although they had moved to its subsidiary label Dreamtime by the time of their second album (Transfixion). A third album was planned for 1993 but this never materialized. At last notice the band’s line-up had expanded to accommodate two drummers, two bass guitarists, a full light-show and greater emphasis on electronic samples.

In 2018, Dave "Auntie" Godbald reformed the band and he is currently working on a new album called "Invincible".

Discography
 1989 Demo (Cassette)
 1989 Sacrifice To Strength (12”)
 1990 Jagd (LP/CD, CD contains 3 extra tracks that feature on Sacrifice To Strength and Casket Case)
 1990 Casket Case (12”, Re-release of Sacrifice To Strength with 2 dub mixes of tracks from Jagd)
 1992 Transfixion (LP/CD)
 1993 The Blastecyst Mixes (12”, Limited & numbered)
 1994 Tapet / Nedrevet Og Strukket (7", Split with Headbutt)
 2021 Altar (Digital, Single)

References

External links
Sonic Violence discography @ Discogs.com
Sonic Violence @ Myspace
Sonic Violence - Manic / Interview

British hardcore punk groups
British heavy metal musical groups
Musical groups established in 1989
Musical groups disestablished in 1993